Brittany Anne Byrnes (born 31 July 1987) is an Australian actress. Her most notable acting role has been Charlotte Watsford in H2O: Just Add Water.

Personal life 
Byrnes was born in Australia and trained in all aspects of dance at the Bradshaw Dancers Performing Arts Academy from the age of four. She attended Terra Sancta College in Quakers Hill, a suburb of Sydney, during her high school years.

She has been acting since she was seven, when she played her first role in the movie Babe. She was later given a lead role in the TV movie When Good Ghouls Go Bad. One of her latest roles was Charlotte Watsford on Network Ten's H2O: Just Add Water.

Acting career 
Byrnes' first theatrical role was in Babe, where she played the Hoggetts' spoiled granddaughter. She has since appeared in films such as Little Oberon, Mermaids and Swimming Upstream. Byrnes has also been in a number of television shows, including BeastMaster, All Saints and the second season of the Australian show H2O: Just Add Water as the new girl, Charlotte Watsford.

In 2005, Brittany was nominated for an AFI Award (The Young Actor's Award) for her performance in Little Oberon. In 2008, she was nominated again for an AFI Award (Best Supporting Actress in a television drama) for her performance in H2O: Just Add Water.

Filmography

Awards and nominations

References

External links 
 
 

1987 births
Australian child actresses
Australian film actresses
Australian television actresses
Living people
20th-century Australian actresses
21st-century Australian actresses